The 1919–20 Toronto St. Patricks season was the third season of the Toronto National Hockey League franchise. The franchise was sold to the owners of the Toronto St. Patricks amateur hockey association and renamed the St. Patricks. The club improved on its record from the previous season, but did not make the playoffs as the Ottawa Senators won both halves of the season.

Offseason

Regular season

Final standings

Record vs. opponents

Schedule and results

Player statistics

Scorers

Playoffs
The team failed to qualify for the playoffs.

Transactions

 November 25, 1919: Rights of Dave Ritchie transferred to Quebec Bulldogs
 December 8, 1919: Signed Free Agent Frank Heffernan
 December 9, 1919: Signed Free Agent Duke Keats
 December 15, 1919: Signed Free Agents Babe Dye, Howard Lockhart and Ivan Mitchell
 January 5, 1920: Signed Free Agent Red Stuart
 February 28, 1920: Signed Free Agent Jake Forbes

References

Toronto St. Patricks seasons
Toronto St. Patricks season, 1919-20
Toronto